Crumpler is an Australian bag brand and manufacturer with two separately held companies who design and supply different products to their respective markets. The company's Pacific headquarterers are in Melbourne, Australia, while its European office serving other markets is in Berlin, Germany. Established in 1995, Crumpler's products are aimed at young people aged 18 to 35 years old, and have been known for its colourful designs and quirky humorous marketing.

History 

Crumpler was founded in Melbourne in 1995 by Dave Roper and Will Miller (ex bike couriers and founders of Minuteman Messengers), and sculptor / furniture maker / bike courier Stuart Crumpler. Stuart designed the original Crumpler logo in 1991 which he branded onto his furniture designs. From the beginning, the bags were designed for bike messengers, in particular those working for David Roper and Will Miller's bike courier company, Minuteman. The range grew to include more options in colours and sizes. The story goes Minuteman needed better bags and Dave approached Stuart who was working part-time as a bike courier and asked if he could make 20 for the fleet. The simple shoulder bags were much more practical for the job than a backpack (no need to remove completely to access the contents). After making gradual improvements to the materials and design Stuart & Dave met at The George Hotel in St Kilda and decided to start a bag company. In its early days, the three founders drove around stencilling the Crumpler logo on public surfaces, for which they were fined, but generated word-of-mouth publicity.

In the late 1990s, Crumpler established Melbourne Alleycat races, consisting of illegal street races for cycle messengers. They then also sponsored similar races in other Australian cities. This led to them sponsoring the annual Australian Cycle Messenger Championships.

Crumpler had a booth at the 2005 Consumer Electronics Show to introduce its brand to American technology retailers.

Stuart Crumpler sold his share of Crumpler to Roper and Miller in 2011. Roper and Miller left the company in 2015 after Crescent Capital bought a majority stake and took over management.

Crumpler became the "official luggage sponsor" for the Australian Olympic team in 2015.

The company purchased Australian swimwear brand Tigerlily out of administration in 2020.

In September 2021 it was reported Crumpler had been placed into administration.

In November 2021, David Roper, now joined by his daughter Virginia Martin, announced they had reacquired Crumpler. The father-daughter team beat out more than 60 expressions of interest and bids from 20 parties. The duo also announced the return of the original logo and a revisit to Crumpler's artistic roots.    The Smith St, Fitzroy store reopened in December 2021, having been converted to a showroom with the addition of a workshop where designers can be seen creating limited, exclusive Fitzroy versions of classic Crumpler bags.

Brand and marketing

Its original logo consisted of a stick figure with dreadlocks, designed before the company was founded. In 2018, the Crumpler brand evolved with the launch of an all-new logo, which was met with significant backlash. Its slogan as of 2009 was "Crumpler makes you sexy." As of early 2022, the original Crumpler logo has returned, with select new products featuring the beloved icon being manufactured.  

Crumpler became known for unusual marketing largely credited to Dave Roper which is deliberately informal with an idiosyncratic approach. Some of its approaches include giant logo stencils painted on building site hoardings, the infamous Beer for Bags event where beer was the only currency accepted in store during the sale, logo fruit stickers placed on millions of apples and oranges, tiny boxes of matches, and using a nude body model to demonstrate the sizes of its bags. Their bags are given wacky names, for example "Barney Rustle," "Complete Seed," and "Moderate Embarrassment."

This approach also spread to the company's web site after a redesign, which was considered to be cryptic and difficult to navigate. Vincent Flanders' Web Pages that Suck listed it as the second-worst web site of 2006.

The brand achieved high popularity among younger shoppers in Australia, known for its colourful and compact designs. It has been highly associated with laptop and camera bags. Crumpler was for a time also highly popular in Singapore.

Stores

In Australia, Crumpler sells mostly exclusively through their own stores. There are currently also stores in Singapore and Malaysia. In other countries it is usually through a dealer network. Its first UK store opened at the start of 2008. Crumpler Europe no longer has its own physical stores and is now only trading online.

The brand has also had various pop-up stores worldwide. In 2015 one of these opened in the 1st arrondissement of Paris at the petite Cremerie de Paris.
In 2018, the Crumpler store footprint expanded significantly with pop-up stores opened in Market City, Sydney, Rhodes Waterside Shopping Centre, Robina Town Centre, Queensland and the Australian Open tennis Grand Slam event.

Due to voluntary administration, in 2021 all 11 Crumpler stores across Australia were closed down indefinitely. Since Roper's acquirement, four stores have been reopened - Brisbane, Sydney Galleries, Little Bourke St and Fitzroy - whilst a newly-located Adelaide Store was undergoing fit-out as of October 2022.

Gallery

References

External links
Crumpler.com
Crumpler.eu

Manufacturing companies of Australia
Australian brands
Privately held companies of Australia
Australian companies established in 1995
Photography equipment